Signorinette is a 1942 Italian drama film directed by Luigi Zampa and starring Carla Del Poggio.

Cast
 Carla Del Poggio as Renata
 Paola Veneroni as Iris
 Anna Mari as Gisella
 Nella Paoli as Paola
 Claudio Gora as Marco Lancia, the writer
 Roberto Villa as Giorgio
 Giovanna Galletti as The gymnastics teacher
 Checco Durante as Iris' father
 Jone Morino as Iris' mother
 Bella Starace Sainati as Iris' grandmother

References

External links

1942 films
1942 drama films
Italian drama films
1940s Italian-language films
Italian black-and-white films
Films directed by Luigi Zampa
1940s Italian films